Mexico competed at the 1996 Summer Olympics in Atlanta, United States.

Medalists

Archery

In its fifth Olympic archery competition, Mexico entered three competitors.  José Anchondo was the most successful, winning two matches before losing his third.

Athletics

Track & road events
Men

Women

Boxing

Canoeing

Sprint
Men

Women

Qualification Legend: SF = Qualify to semifinal; R=Repechage

Cycling

Road Competition
Men's Individual Time Trial
Jesus Zarate
 Final — 1:11:42 (→ 30th place)

Track Competition
Men's Points Race
 Marco Zaragoza
 Final — did not finish (→ no ranking)

Diving
Men's 3m Springboard
Fernando Platas
 Preliminary Heat — 382.83
 Semi Final — 217.62
 Final — 402.36 (→ 8th place)

Joël Rodríguez
 Preliminary Heat — 296.91 (→ did not advance, 30th place)

Men's 10m Platform
Fernando Platas
Alberto Acosta

Women's 3m Springboard
María Alcalá
 Preliminary Heat — 257.01
 Semi Final — 193.62 (→ did not advance, 13th place)

Maria Elena Romero
 Preliminary Heat — 252.84
 Semi Final — 187.35 (→ did not advance, 17th place)

Women's 10m Platform
María Alcalá

Modern pentathlon
Men's Individual Competition:
 Sergio Salazar – 5387 pts (→ 9th place)
 Horacio de la Vega – 5182 pts (→ 23rd place)

Swimming
Men's 100m Backstroke
 Carlos Arena
 Heat – 57.40 (→ did not advance, 30th place)

Men's 200m Backstroke
 Carlos Arena
 Heat – 2:05.96 (→ did not advance, 30th place)

Men's 100m Butterfly
 Jesús González
 Heat – 54.94 (→ did not advance, 29th place)

Synchronized swimming

Tennis
Men's Singles Competition:
 Oscar Ortiz
 First round — Defeated Dinu Pescariu (Romania) 6-2, 6-2
 Second round — Lost to Andrea Gaudenzi (Italy) 1-6, 6-7
 Alejandro Hernandez
 First round — Lost to Christian Ruud (Norway) 3-6, 6-2, 6-8

See also
Mexico at the 1995 Pan American Games

References

sports-reference

Nations at the 1996 Summer Olympics
1996
Olympics